Abdul al-Qādir Mū‘min (born possibly early 1960s) is a Somali islamist and he is the leader of the Islamic State in Somalia. He was formerly a senior religious authority in al-Shabab.

History
Born in Qandala, Puntland Somalia to a Majerteen Ali saleeban parents, Mū‘min arrived to the United Kingdom in 2005–2006, having lived 1990-2003 in a north-eastern district Angered of Gothenburg, Sweden. While in the UK, he preached at Masjid Quba in Leicester and the Greenwich Islamic Centre in London. In 2010, he took part in a press conference alongside the ex-Guantanamo Bay prisoner Moazzam Begg for the charity CAGE, which was launching a report criticizing Western anti-terror tactics in East Africa.

A few months later he fled to Somalia, after coming under investigation by MI5 for radicalising young men. Mumin had given sermons at the mosque attended by Michael Adebolajo, one of the Islamic terrorists responsible for the murder of British soldier Lee Rigby. He joined al-Shabaab and publicly burned his British passport before a crowd of supporters in a mosque.

On 22 October 2015, he pledged allegiance to Abu Bakr al-Baghdadi and the Islamic State, creating the "Islamic State in Somalia" (Abnaa ul-Calipha). He is located in the Galgala region, in Puntland, Somalia.

On 31 August 2016, he was designated as a 'Specially Designated Global Terrorist' by the United States Department of State.

References

1950s births
Living people
Al-Shabaab (militant group) members
Somalian Muslims
Islamic State of Iraq and the Levant members
Individuals designated as terrorists by the United States government
Leaders of Islamic terror groups